Frank Peterson (born 29 December 1963) is a German music producer known for his work with Enigma and artists such as Sarah Brightman, Ofra Haza, Gregorian, Princessa, and Andrea Bocelli on his first international album, Romanza.

Peterson was born in Hamburg. As a child, he taught himself to play the piano and keyboard, going on to work in a music store. It was here that he met Michael Cretu and became lead keyboardist for Sandra, appearing prominently on her hit single "Maria Magdalena".

He was a member of Sandra's band for a few more years, then moved with the Cretus to Ibiza. While there, he became involved with Cretu's new project, Enigma, under the pseudonym of F. Gregorian. Peterson contributed to their first album, MCMXC a.D., writing several tracks.

He left the group in 1991 and pursued work on Gregorian, a musical project co-founded by Thomas Schwarz and Matthias Meissner. The female vocals for this album were provided by The Sisters of Oz—a duo composed of Birgit Freud and Susana Espelleta, who was married to Peterson at the time. Soon after, he met English soprano Sarah Brightman and collaborated with her on her solo albums Dive through Symphony.

Gregorian was re-invented later on in Peterson's career as a group performing Gregorian chant arrangements of popular songs. Peterson's inspiration, as he stated in an interview, was the approaching new millennium and its spiritual aspect.

In 1997, Peterson collaborated with Israeli singer Ofra Haza, producing her last album, Ofra Haza.

Other artists whom Peterson has worked with include Princessa, Carolin Fortenbacher, Violet, and Sinsual.

Lawsuit against Google/YouTube
On 16 April 2009, Billboard reported that Peterson had filed a lawsuit at the Higher District Court in Hamburg against Google/YouTube, claiming that his music videos and other audiovisual repertoire were used illegally. In his lawsuit, Peterson claimed infringement of his copyrights and master rights. He stated that more than 125 million streams of his productions—for which he owns the copyrights and master rights as author, publisher, and producer—had been viewed, for which he never received payment from Google/YouTube.

In the Billboard interview, Jens Schippmann, senior partner of the law firm Kamin & Wilke representing Peterson, claimed the lawsuit was necessary because Peterson never granted any synchronization rights and adaptation rights to GEMA as part of his membership agreement: "The German legal situation is different to the Anglo-American copyright law because in Germany, the copyright itself will always remain with the author and exploitation rights granted do not exclude the author from any decision regarding synchronization and adaptation because of the author's moral right". Schippmann added, "My client did not assign any synchronization or adaptation rights to Google/YouTube and is therefore entitled to demand [they] cease and desist such usage [and] negotiate about demanding appropriate remuneration".

Lutz Melzer, junior partner at the firm, said: "The lawsuit includes our demand for injunction, for information, and accounting about the figures of the usage and the turnover, especially from advertising. In addition, we demand for a court decision that any damages incurred by such exploitation have to be reimbursed by Google/YouTube. So far, we cannot exactly compute the amount of such damages without additional information from YouTube, but it seems that the damages will exceed a few million [U.S.] dollars solely in the Peterson case".

References

External links
 Nemo Studio
 Gregorian Music – Frank Peterson bio
 

1963 births
Living people
Musicians from Hamburg
German record producers
German keyboardists
Enigma (German band) members